Troides is a genus of birdwing butterflies, comprising species found in the Indian subcontinent, southeast Asia, and Oceania.

Species

Twenty species are recognized:

 subgenus: Ripponia
 Troides hypolitus – Rippon's birdwing
 subgenus: Troides
 species group: Troides aeacus
 Troides aeacus – golden birdwing
 Troides dohertyi – Talaud black birdwing
 Troides magellanus – Magellan birdwing
 Troides minos – southern birdwing
 Troides plateni – Dr. Platen's birdwing
 Troides prattorum – Buru opalescent birdwing
 Troides rhadamantus – golden birdwing
 species group: Troides amphrysus
 Troides amphrysus – Malay birdwing
 Troides andromache – Borneo birdwing
 Troides cuneifera
 Troides miranda – Miranda birdwing
 species group: Troides haliphron
 Troides criton – Criton birdwing
 Troides darsius – Sri Lankan birdwing
 Troides haliphron – haliphron birdwing
 Troides plato – silver birdwing
 Troides riedeli – Riedel's birdwing
 Troides staudingeri
 Troides vandepolli – van de Poll's birdwing
 species group: Troides helena
 Troides helena – common birdwing
 Troides oblongomaculatus – oblong-spotted birdwing

References

Butterfly genera
Papilionidae
Taxa named by Jacob Hübner